East Cree, also known as (Eastern) James Bay Cree, and East Main Cree, is a group of Cree dialects spoken in Quebec, Canada on the east coast of lower Hudson Bay and James Bay, and inland southeastward from James Bay. Cree is one of the most spoken non-official aboriginal languages of Canada. Four dialects have been tentatively identified including the Southern Inland dialect (Iyiniw-Ayamiwin) spoken in Mistissini, Oujé-Bougoumou, Waswanipi, and Nemaska; the Southern Coastal dialect (Iyiyiw-Ayamiwin) spoken in Nemaska, Waskaganish, and Eastmain; the Northern Coastal Dialects (Iyiyiw-Ayimiwin), one spoken in Wemindji and Chisasibi and the other spoken in Whapmagoostui. The dialects are mutually intelligible, though difficulty arises as the distance between communities increases.

East Cree is not considered an endangered language due to many young speakers who are using the language (Mela S.; Mali A. 2009). According to the 2011 Canada Census, there are currently 83,475 speakers of Cree alone, and a total of 144,015 Algonquian speakers. According to the statistics, Cree is the largest language practiced and alive in comparison to all the other languages in the Algonquian family. The rest are ranging anywhere from 3250 speakers to 19,275.

Phonology
The long vowels *ē and *ā have merged in the northern coastal dialects but remain distinct in the southern coastal and southern inland dialects; southern inland has merged *s with *š, which remain distinct in the coastal dialects. Neighboring Naskapi has both.

In East Cree there are thirteen consonants:

There are eight vowels:

Morphology
In East Cree you have Primary Derivation, Secondary Derivation, and Composition.

Primary Derivation

Words constructed by primary derivation, are made up of two or more stems, that are not words that stand on their own.

For example, the verb ᐱᓱᐸᔨᐤ pisupiyiu, s/he/it goes slow is made up of an initial pisu- and a final piyi- that are not words themselves.

English Translation: She/he/it goes slow.

Secondary Derivation

Words constructed by secondary derivation, are made up of core word stems and at least one other stem-building elements.

For example, the verb ᐱᓱᐱᔨᐦᑖᐤ pisupiyihtaau s/he makes it go slow is made up of the stem of the existing verb ᐱᓱᐱᔨᐤ pisupiyiu and the causative final -htaa.

English Translation: she/he/it makes it go slow.

Composition

Words constructed by composition contains independent elements, like two existing word stems, or a preform and another word stem.

For example, the noun ᒥᔥᑎᑯᓈᐹᐤ mishtikunaapaau carpenter is made by conjoining two other noun stems: ᒥᔥᑎᒄ mishtikw wood and ᓈᐹᐤ napaau man.

Independent elements forming with Verbs

English Translation: It is a good day

Independent elements forming with Nouns

English Translation: carpenter

Gender, number, person

Gender
Gender is a grammatical distinction. Within gender, East Cree has 'Animate' and 'Inanimate' gender differentiation. However, unless you are a fluent speaker of the language, it is really hard to know for sure if words are animate or inanimate.

Animate words refer to humans, animals, general living creatures, also including some plants and some personal belongings such as pants and sled. To indicate the plural you add suffix -ich, or in some cases when the word ends with a w, you drop the w and add -uch.

Some more examples of Animate words are,

Inanimate Inanimate plural is indicated by suffix -h.

Number
As shown above we can see that the Number is dependent on the Gender therefore if we have an Animate word then the ending for the plural will be ich in most cases and in some cases when the word ends in a w the ending will be uch after you drop the w. On the other hand, for Inanimate words the ending to indicate the plural will be adding an h to the end of the word.

Person
To indicate possession, noun stems take a personal prefix. In East Cree there are Independent and Dependent nouns.

Independent nouns are ones that can appear without personal prefixes. Therefore, they can stand alone as a word, and if you want to indicate to whom it belongs to, you would add the prefix. Example shown below.

We can see that for this example the noun is Independent because it can stand alone, also, we see that it is an inanimate noun because the plural form adds an h at the end when the plural is indicted. Please refer to Gender to understand the relationship of Animate and Inanimate nouns in respect to gender.

Dependent nouns are those that can not stand alone without a prefix. These type of nouns express kinship, body parts, and personal belongings, like certain pieces of clothing.

Below is the table of Prefixes and Suffixes for some Dependent Nouns that are Animate

Classification on verbs
East Cree adds suffixes on verbs in order to distinguish classes based on two factors, transitivity and gender. When referring to transitivity it means if the verbs is intransitive or transitive, and when referring to gender, it means if the subject or object of the verb is animate or inanimate. When we are looking at intransitive verbs, we see that the animacy of the subject matters. However, when we are looking at a transitive verb, we see that the animacy of the object is what matters. Below is a table that describes the differences between the transitive, intransitive and animate, inanimate in regards to the verbs and their role.

Different classes have different endings. Below is a table that describes the different ending for each classification. The classifications are, Verb Transitive Animate (VTA), Verb Intransitive Inanimate (VII), Verb Transitive Inanimate (VTI), Verb Animate Intransitive (VAI).

Verb Intransitive Inanimate (VII) only have one role (intransitive) filled by an inanimate subject. These verbs have endings such as, -n or vowels.

Verb Transitive Inanimate (VTI) have two roles (transitive) filled by an animate subject and an inanimate object. These verbs have an -am ending. They can be found in all orders with all persons.

Verb Transitive Animate (VTA) have two roles (transitive) filled by an animate subject and an animate object. Both the agent and the patient are animate. They can end in many endings, but one of them is -eu.

 Verb Animate Intransitive (VAI) usually only have one role (intransitive) filled by an animate subject. They end in -n and -vowels'.

Space and time

Space
In East Cree there are Demonstrative Pronouns this are distinguished by three areas. The Proximal noted by uu, which can occur with suffixes. The proximal is used to indicate either a person or an object that is close to the speaker and in sight of the speaker. Then there is the Distal noted by an at the beginning of a word. The distal is used to indicate something or something specific that is slightly farther away from the speaker. In addition, there is the Remote noted as (a)naa or (a)nwaa and is used to indicate that someone or something is far away from the speaker. In East Cree, there are two sets of demonstratives. One is to use in a normal speech setting which means, to just speak to one another and the other form is used with gestures such as hand gestures, to point or signal.

Below is a table demonstrating the relation of prefixes on the words using the proximal, distal, and the remote for Animate Pronouns. Simple Speech no gestures required.

Below is a table demonstrating the relation of prefixes on the words using the proximal, distal, and the remote for Inanimate Pronouns.

Time
East Cree tense is marked on the preverbs attached to the pronoun. There is an indicative of past and future tense on the preverb such as, che, chii, kata, chika, nika, chechii, wii, nipah, chipah, e, kaa, uhchi. These preverbs indicate different aspects of the tense and when you use each one. Below is a table that shows the different environment for each preverb.

Word order
In East Cree, all six word orders SVO, SOV, OVS, OSV, VOS, and VSO are grammatical. Below is a chart to see how they could all be used to construct the sentence, The children killed some ducks

Case
There is a ranking system of the grammatical functions where the subject outranks the object. This appears on the transitive verb with an animate object in order to indicate the person hierarchy, whether it be aligned (DIRECT) or crossed (INVERSE). Below is a table that demonstrates the hierarchy and the functions.

For the Direct we can see that the Proximant is reflected on the Subject and the Agent while the Obviative is reflected through the Object and the Patient.

For the Inverse we can see that the Proximate is reflected inversely through the Object and then through the Patient, then we can see that the Obviative is reflected through the Subject and then through the Agent.

For the Passive we can see that the Proximate is reflected through the Subject then through the Patient. Then we see the Obviative through the Object and then the Agent.

The notation in the example is represented with an X to indicate the switch.

Possession
East Cree marks its possessions on the nouns by adding a secondary suffix to a possessed noun with a third-person prefix. See examples below that indicate the addition of suffixes and prefixes. There is a difference in which suffix and prefix you use if the noun in questions is animate or inanimate.

Complements
In East Cree sometimes one sentence is contained within another sentence, this is known as a subordinate or embedded clause. The verb of the subordinate clauses have conjunct suffixes and often a conjunct preverb. Below is a table detailing the subordinate clauses.

The bold part of the sentence indicates the subordinate clause in both languages.

Adverbial clauses is when the subordinate clause provides information about the time at which something happened, or the frequency with which it happens. Below are some examples of adverbial clauses.

Relative Clauses is when the subordinate clause functions as a complement to a noun. Below is an example.

References

Swain, Erin. "The Acquisition of Stress in Northern East Cree: A Case Study." Order No. MR55290 Memorial University of Newfoundland (Canada), 2008. Ann Arbor: ProQuest. Web. 31 Jan. 2014.

"The Structure of Cree Words." Eastern James Bay Cree Language. N.p., n.d. Web. 19 Feb. 2014.

"Nouns Inflected for Gender." Eastern James Bay Cree Language. N.p., n.d. Web. 19 Feb. 2014.

"Nouns Inflected for Gender." Eastern James Bay Cree Language. N.p., n.d. Web. 19 Feb. 2014.

"Nouns with Person Inflection." Eastern James Bay Cree Language. N.p., n.d. Web. 19 Feb. 2014.

"Demonstrative Pronouns." Eastern James Bay Cree Language. N.p., n.d. Web. 15 Mar.

"Cree Verb Classes." Eastern James Bay Cree Language. N.p., n.d. Web. 26 Mar. 2014.

Junker, M. (2004). Focus, obviation, and word order in East Cree. Lingua, 114 (3), pp. 345–365

Junker, Marie-Odile, Marguerite MacKenzie, and Julie Brittain. "Comparative Structures of East Cree and English." (2012): 1-57. Print

Nikkel, Walter. Language Revitalization in Northern Manitoba: A study of a Cree Bilingual Program in an Elementary School

Www12.statcan.gc.ca,. (2014). Aboriginal languages in Canada. Retrieved 8 May 2014

External links
 Eastcree.org
 Terry, Kevin. Thesis. The Emergence of Intransitive Verb Inflection in Northern East Cree: A Case Study. Memorial University of Newfoundland (St. Johns, Newfoundland: December 2009).
 Dyck, Carrie, Julie Brittain, Marguerite MacKenzie. "Northern East Cree Accent" in Proceedings of the 2006 annual conference of the Canadian Linguistic Association.
 OLAC resources in and about the Northern East Cree language
 OLAC resources in and about the Southern East Cree language

+
Central Algonquian languages
Indigenous languages of the North American eastern woodlands
First Nations languages in Canada